Tom Busby (7 November 1936 – 20 September 2003) was a Canadian actor and agent. Among his film credits were The War Lover (1962); The Dirty Dozen (1967) as Milo Vladek, one of the dozen; and Heavenly Pursuits (1986).

Biography
Busby was born in Toronto, Ontario, Canada. He was responsible for training Glasgow youngsters at Community Service Volunteers (CSV). Among his many pupils were Billy Boyd, actor (The Lord of the Rings), and Cameron McKenna, voice-over artist (BBC and STV announcer). Busby also directed comedian Chic Murray in another version of A Christmas Carol shown in 1992 on the BBC. 

The novelist Siân Busby was his daughter.

He died on September 20, 2003 at his home in Glasgow, Scotland; he was 66 years old. The cause of death was a heart attack.

Filmography

References

External links

1936 births
2003 deaths
Male actors from Toronto
Canadian expatriates in Scotland
Canadian male film actors
British male film actors
Tom Busby
20th-century British male actors
20th-century Canadian male actors